Ramol is a city and a municipality in Ahmedabad district in the Indian state of Gujarat.

Demographics
 India census, Ramol had a population of 27,539. Males constitute 55% of the population and females 45%. Ramol has an average literacy rate of 65%, higher than the national average of 59.5%: male literacy is 71%, and female literacy is 57%. In Ramol, 15% of the population is under 6 years of age.

Ramol Jantanagar
Ramol Jantanagar is one of the two Jantanagars in Ahmedabad city  other one is Chandkheda Jantanagar.

References

Cities and towns in Ahmedabad district
Neighbourhoods in Ahmedabad